Crow Wing County is a county in the East Central part of the U.S. state of Minnesota. As of the 2020 census, the population was 66,123. Its county seat is Brainerd. The county was formed in 1857, and was organized in 1870.

Crow Wing County is included in the Brainerd, MN Micropolitan Statistical Area.

History
This area was long occupied by the Ojibwe people, also known as Chippewa. In addition, numerous Dakota people lived in central and southern Minnesota before European settlement. European Americans established a trading post by 1837 in this area, on the east side of the Mississippi River opposite the mouth of the Crow Wing River. The post (named Crow Wing) soon became a center of trading with the region's Native Americans, with a general-supply store that served the area. By 1866, the village contained about 600 whites and Chippewa; it was a major population center. The territorial government enacted the county's creation on May 23, 1857, and named Crow Wing the county seat. The governmental structure of the county was not effected until March 3, 1870. The county was named for the river, which is named for an island in the river that resembles a crow's wing.

Brainerd township was founded in 1870 when the Northern Pacific Railroad selected the site for a crossing of the Mississippi River. It attracted development and population, soon surpassing Crow Wing. It was also designated as the new county seat, drawing off more residents and businesses from what became known as a ghost town, Old Crow Wing. Crow Wing State Park encompasses much of the former village site along the river.

Brainerd City was incorporated on November 19, 1881, named for Lawrence Brainerd, the father-in-law of J. Gregory Smith, the first president of the Northern Pacific Railroad Company. Smith served as governor of Vermont from 1863 to 1865 before moving west. He is called the father and founder of Brainerd. Lawrence Brainerd was the first president of the Vermont Central Railroad.  The Northern Pacific Railroad ran a special train as its first service to Brainerd on March 11, 1871. Its regular passenger service began the next September. The first passenger train from the Twin Cities, by way of Sauk Rapids, arrived on November 1, 1877.

On February 18, 1887, the Minnesota legislature annexed part of Cass County (west of the Mississippi) to Crow Wing County, which doubled the former area of Crow Wing County.

Geography

Topography and vegetation
Crow Wing County has two state forests, the Crow Wing State Forest and the Emily State Forest. The Cuyuna Lakes State Trail lies in the Upper Mississippi River Basin. The topography is gently rolling to flat, mostly wooded and heavily dotted with waters and wetlands. It is home to an abundance of wildlife, including white-tailed deer, cottontail rabbit, snowshoe hare, raccoon, red fox, gray fox, coyote, mink, muskrat, squirrels, beaver, occasional American black bear, Bald eagle, osprey and many other waterfowl.

Lakes and rivers
The main river is the Mississippi River, and there are several smaller streams.
It has about 417 recognized lakes. The top ten by size are:
 Gull Lake – 
 Pelican Lake – 
 Upper and Lower White Fish Lake – 
 North Long Lake – 
 Lake Edward – 
 Bay Lake – 
 Cross Lake – 
 Round Lake – 
 Big Trout Lake – 
 Lower South Long Lake –

Major highways

  U.S. Route 169
  Minnesota State Highway 6
  Minnesota State Highway 18
  Minnesota State Highway 25
  Minnesota State Highway 210
  Minnesota State Highway 371

Adjacent counties

 Aitkin County – northeast
 Mille Lacs County – southeast
 Morrison County – southwest
 Cass County – northwest, north

Protected areas

 Crow Wing State Forest
 Crow Wing State Park (part)
 Cuyuna Country State Recreation Area
 Cuyuna Lakes State Trail (within Cuyuna Country SRA)
 Duck Lakes State Wildlife Management Area
 Emily State Forest
 Loerch State Wildlife Management Area
 Mille Lacs Moraine Scientific and Natural Area
 Safari North Wildlife Park
 Upper Dean State Wildlife Management Area

Superfund site and environmental damage
The presence of railroads increased development in the county, but also brought environmental problems. The Burlington Northern (Brainerd/Baxter) EPA Superfund site is between Brainerd and Baxter. Burlington Northern Railroad had a treatment plant in Crow Wing County for railroad ties, to protect the wood from weather and insects. Wastewater generated from the wood-treating process was sent to two shallow, unlined ponds. This created sludge that contaminated both the underlying soils and the groundwater with creosote and polynuclear aromatic hydrocarbons (PAHs).

Demographics

2000 census
As of the 2000 United States census, there were 55,099 people, 22,250 households, and 15,174 families in the county. The population density was 55.2/sqmi (21.3/km2). There were 33,483 housing units at an average density of 33.5/sqmi (12.9/km2). The racial makeup of the county was 97.64% White, 0.31% Black or African American, 0.78% Native American, 0.28% Asian, 0.01% Pacific Islander, 0.20% from other races, and 0.78% from two or more races. 0.69% of the population were Hispanic or Latino of any race. 32.5% were of German, 16.4% Norwegian, 9.4% Swedish, 6.2% Irish and 5.2% American ancestry.

There were 22,250 households, out of which 30.20% had children under the age of 18 living with them, 56.70% were married couples living together, 8.00% had a female householder with no husband present, and 31.80% were non-families. 26.40% of all households were made up of individuals, and 11.70% had someone living alone who was 65 years of age or older. The average household size was 2.43 and the average family size was 2.93.

The county population contained 24.80% under the age of 18, 8.10% from 18 to 24, 25.60% from 25 to 44, 24.40% from 45 to 64, and 17.10% who were 65 years of age or older. The median age was 39 years. For every 100 females there were 96.80 males. For every 100 females age 18 and over, there were 94.50 males.

The median income for a household in the county was $37,589, and the median income for a family was $44,847. Males had a median income of $33,838 versus $22,896 for females. The per capita income for the county was $19,174. About 6.50% of families and 9.80% of the population were below the poverty line, including 11.40% of those under age 18 and 9.90% of those age 65 or over.

2020 Census

Communities

Cities

 Baxter
 Brainerd (county seat)
 Breezy Point
 Crosby
 Crosslake
 Cuyuna
 Deerwood
 Emily
 Fifty Lakes
 Fort Ripley
 Garrison
 Ironton
 Jenkins
 Manhattan Beach
 Nisswa
 Pequot Lakes
 Riverton
 Trommald

Census-designated place
 Merrifield

Unincorporated communities

 Barrows
 Bay Lake
 Crosby Beach
 Crow Wing
 Ideal Corners
 Iron Hub
 Klondyke
 Lake Hubert
 Legionville
 Little Pine
 Loerch
 Mission
 Old Crow Wing (ghost town)
 Pine Center
 Saint Mathias
 Shephard
 Swanburg
 Wolford
 Woodrow

Townships

 Bay Lake Township
 Center Township
 Crow Wing Township
 Daggett Brook Township
 Deerwood Township
 Fairfield Township
 Fort Ripley Township
 Gail Lake Township
 Garrison Township
 Ideal Township
 Irondale Township
 Jenkins Township
 Lake Edwards Township
 Little Pine Township
 Long Lake Township
 Maple Grove Township
 Mission Township
 Nokay Lake Township
 Oak Lawn Township
 Pelican Township
 Perry Lake Township
 Platte Lake Township
 Rabbit Lake Township
 Roosevelt Township
 Ross Lake Township
 Saint Mathias Township
 Sibley Township (former)
 Timothy Township
 Wolford Township

Unorganized territories
 Dean Lake
 West Crow Wing

Government and politics
Crow Wing County has voted Republican for several decades. In only one presidential election since 1976 has the county selected the Democratic candidate.

Education
School districts include:
 Aitkin Public School District
 Brainerd Public School District
 Crosby-Ironton Public School District
 Little Falls Public School District
 Onamia Public School District
 Pequot Lakes Public Schools
 Pierz Public School District
 Pine River-Backus Public School District

See also 
 National Register of Historic Places listings in Crow Wing County, Minnesota
 List of Superfund sites in Minnesota

References

External links

 Crow Wing County official website
 Crow Wing County Historical Society website

 
Minnesota counties on the Mississippi River
1870 establishments in Minnesota
Populated places established in 1870